This is a list of rural localities in Tambov Oblast. Tambov Oblast (Tambovskaya oblast) is a federal subject of Russia (an oblast). Its administrative center is the city of Tambov. As of the 2010 Census, its population was 1,091,994.

Locations 
 Alexandrovka
 Bondari
 Bukari
 Donskoye
 Fonovka
 Gavrilovka 2-ya
 Glazok
 Inokovka
 Kotovskoye
 Lavrovo
 Lvovo
 Mozdok
 Petrovskoye
 Pichayevo
 Sampur
 Satinka
 Satino
 Shapkino
 Staroyuryevo
 Usovo

See also 

 
 Lists of rural localities in Russia

References 

Tambov Oblast